Juncus balticus is a species of rush known by the common name Baltic rush. It is a perennial flowering plant in the family Juncaceae. This plant can reach a height of about 75 cm. It is native to maritime areas of northern Britain, the Baltic and Scandinavia where it occurs in dune slacks. It is available from specialist nurseries for landscaping and soil stabilization purposes.

See also
Crown of thorns

References

Bibliography
C.Michael Hogan, ed. 2010. Juncus balticus. Encyclopedia of Life.

balticus
Plants described in 1809